Dehrud-e Olya (also Romanized as Dehrūd-e ‘Olyā and Dehrood Olya; also known as Dehrūd-e Bālā) is a village in Dehrud Rural District, Eram District, Dashtestan County, Bushehr Province, Iran. At the 2006 census, its population was 1,082, in 207 families.

References 

Populated places in Dashtestan County